Castanheiras (Portuguese meaning chestnut) is a municipality located in the Brazilian state of Rondônia. Its population was 2,987 (2020) and its area is 893 km2.

See also
Castanheira
Castanheiro (disambiguation)

References

External links
https://web.archive.org/web/20061202233440/http://www.citybrazil.com.br/ro/castanheiras/ 

Municipalities in Rondônia